The Ewamin or Agwamin are an indigenous Australian people of the state of Queensland.

Language
Their language, now extinct, was formerly thought to be interchangeable with Wamin. Peter Sutton's fieldwork in the early 1970s enabled him to draw up word-lists from two languages, respectively Wamin and Agwamin which revealed that they were separate dialects. There was only one speaker of the language alive in 1981.

Country
Their northern limits reached as far as Georgetown, Mount Surprise, and Lancewood. Their eastern boundaries lay up around the Great Dividing Range, while their western reaches touched the headwaters of the Percy River. They were present at the contemporary sites oft Oak Park, Einasleigh, Queensland Einasleigh and Forsayth.

The Mbabaram lay directly north of the Ewamin. In clockwise direction, their eastern neighbours where the Warungu, and the Gugu-Badhun, and, south-east, the Gudjal. On their southern flank were the

Alternative names
 Wimanja.
 Agwamin.
 Egwamin.
 Gwamin.
 Ak Waumin.
 Wamin.
 Wommin, Waumin, Wawmin.
 Walamin.
 Wommin.
 Walming.
 Wailoolo.

Some words
 twa (dog)

Notes

Citations

Sources

Aboriginal peoples of Queensland